

Banking

A trustee savings bank is a type of financial institution.

 In the United Kingdom:
 Trustee Savings Bank, a bank in the United Kingdom that merged with Lloyds Bank in 1995 to form Lloyds TSB until 2013
 Lloyds TSB, the name used by Lloyds Bank in the United Kingdom from 1999 to 2013
 TSB Bank (United Kingdom), a bank that split from Lloyds Bank in 2013 and divested through a stock market flotation
 In other countries:
 Permanent TSB of Ireland, division of Irish Life and Permanent, formerly Trustee Savings Bank
 TSB (New Zealand), formerly the Taranaki Savings Bank

Other uses
 Technical Service Bulletin for a vehicle fault
 Thiosymbescaline
 Transportation Safety Board of Canada
 Transportation Safety Bureau of Hungary
 Treib–Seelisberg-Bahn, a funicular railway, Uri, Switzerland
 TV. Shinshu, a television station in Nagano Prefecture, Japan
 The Types of the Scandinavian Medieval Ballad classification
 Tryptic Soy Broth